Imperial Rule and the Politics of Nationalism: Anti-Colonial Protest in the French Empire is a book-length study of national independence from the French colonial empire by Adria Lawrence.

Awards
 2015 J. David Greenstone Book Prize for best book in history and politics
 2015 L. Carl Brown Book Prize
 2014 Jervis-Schroeder Best Book Award
 2011 Sage Paper Award 
 2011 Frank L. Wilson Best Paper Award
 The best books of 2013 on Foreign Policy's Middle East Channel

References

External links 
 Imperial Rule and the Politics of Nationalism

2013 non-fiction books
Cambridge University Press books
Books about nationalism
Books about democracy
Books about revolutions
Books about sovereignty
Books about France
Books about imperialism
History books about colonialism
Books about war